Jean-Philibert Mabaya Gizi Amine (born 6 September 1949, Masi-Manimba, Belgian Congo) is a Congolese businessman, engineer, and politician who was a candidate in the 2018 Democratic Republic of the Congo presidential election. He is currently a Senator for the Kwilu Province.

References

Living people
1949 births
Candidates for President of the Democratic Republic of the Congo
Democratic Republic of the Congo businesspeople
Members of the Senate (Democratic Republic of the Congo)
People from Kwilu Province
21st-century Democratic Republic of the Congo people